"Volveras" (English: "You Will Come Back") is the seventh single from Ricky Martin's album, A Medio Vivir (1995). It was released as a single in the United States and Spain on January 7, 1997, and in France in March 1998.

Music video
A music video was shot in January 1997 in New York.

Chart performance
The song reached number six on the Hot Latin Songs in the United States in 1997.

After the success of "Maria" and "Te Extraño, Te Olvido, Te Amo" in France, "Volveras" was also released there as a single in March 1998. It peaked at number forty-eight.

Formats and track listings
French CD single
"Volveras" – 4:50
"Revolución" – 3:50

Charts

Weekly charts

Year-end charts

References

External links

1997 singles
Ricky Martin songs
Spanish-language songs
Songs written by K. C. Porter
Songs written by Luis Gómez Escolar
Pop ballads
1995 songs
Sony Discos singles
Songs written by Ricky Martin
Columbia Records singles
Song recordings produced by K. C. Porter
Sony Music Latin singles
Songs written by Draco Rosa